Adijat Avorshai Idris (born 6 December 2001) is a Nigerian freestyle wrestler.

She participated at the  2021 African & Oceania Wrestling Olympic Qualification.
She competed for the 2020 Summer Olympics in Tokyo, Japan.

References

External links 
 

Living people
Nigerian female sport wrestlers
Wrestlers at the 2020 Summer Olympics
Olympic wrestlers of Nigeria
2001 births
21st-century Nigerian women